James Curtis Owens (July 9, 1951 – May 26, 2016) was a pioneering American football player and coach. He was the first African American player in the history of the Auburn Tigers football team, playing as a running back from 1969 to 1972. He was drafted by the New Orleans Saints in the 1973 NFL Draft but was cut after preseason practices.

Owens pursued a career in coaching, working as an assistant at his alma mater, Auburn University from 1982 to 1985, before serving as the head football coach at Miles College in Fairfield, Alabama from 1986 to 1989.

After retiring from coach, he served as the pastor of Pleasant Ridge Baptist Church in Dadeville, Alabama, from 2001 to 2013.

References

1951 births
2016 deaths
American football running backs
Auburn Tigers football players
Auburn Tigers football coaches
Baptist ministers from the United States
Miles Golden Bears football coaches
People from Fairfield, Alabama
Players of American football from Alabama